Atlético de Madrid Superleague Formula team was a motor racing team representing Spain's Atlético Madrid in the Superleague Formula championship.

They finished 18th and last in the inaugural championship with driver Andy Soucek, having missed the first round of the season at Donington Park. They participated in the 2009 season with the Dutch-Chinese driver Ho-Pin Tung for the first 3 races.
María de Villota replaced him for the last races of the season.

Record
(key)

2008

2009
Super Final results in 2009 did not count for points towards the main championship.

2010

* María de Villota finished 12th in race one and retired in 17th from race two at Jarama. She was subsequently disqualified from race two, after the race had finished, for crashing into Sébastien Bourdais early on after spinning off the track herself. She was also excluded from the race one result and lost the 14 points she would have earned for that finish.

Gallery

References

External links
 Atlético Madrid Superleague Formula team minisite
 Official Atlético de Madrid football club website

Atlético Madrid
Superleague Formula club teams
2008 establishments in Spain